Brightblack Morning Light is the second studio album by American musical group Brightblack Morning Light. The album was released on June 20, 2006 by Matador Records.

Critical reception 

Brightblack Morning Light was named the 36th best album of 2006 by Pitchfork. In 2018, Pitchfork listed it at number 23 on its list of the 30 best dream pop albums.

Track listing

Personnel 
Brightblack Morning Light
 Rachael A. Hughes – vocals, organ, piano, mixing
 Nathan D. Shineywater – vocals, guitar, bells, congas, mixing

Additional personnel
 Ray Agee – trombone
 Tauba Auerbach – lettering
 Robbie Lee – flute
 Paz Lenchantin – bass, piano
 Magic Andy MacLeod – cymbals, engineering, photography, trap kit
 Ann McCrary – harmony
 Thom Monahan – engineering, mixing
 Mark Nevers – engineering
 Aaron Novik – clarinet
 Andrew Paynter – photography
 Elias Reitz – percussion, conga, tabla, bells, gourd, mouth hat
 A. Gail West – harmony

References 

2006 albums
Brightblack Morning Light albums
Matador Records albums